Jaswinder Singh may refer to:

 Jaswinder Singh (novelist) (born 1954)
 Jaswinder Singh (singer) from Mumbai
 Jaswinder Singh (politician) from Punjab
 Jaswinder Singh Sandhu (1955–2019), politician from Haryana
 Jaswinder Singh Sandhu (general), officer of the Indian Army
 Jaz Dhami (born 1986), born Jaswinder Singh Dhami
 Jazzy B (born 1975), born Jaswinder Singh Bains